The 1993–94 Football League season was the 95th completed season of The Football League. From 1993 to 1996 the league was sponsored by Endsleigh.

Alan Smith kicked off his management career by guiding Crystal Palace to the Division One title and back to the Premier League at the first time of asking. Nottingham Forest, now managed by Frank Clark following Brian Clough's retirement, also made a swift return to the Premier League by finishing runners-up to Palace. They were joined by play-off winners Leicester City, who finally reached the top flight after two successive play-off final defeats.

Oxford United's decline since losing their top-flight status in 1988 continued as they slid into Division Two, along with Peterborough United and Birmingham City.

Mark McGhee won the Division Two title for Reading, with John Rudge's Port Vale taking the other automatic promotion place. Burnley triumphed in the play-offs, thus moving to within one division of the top flight just seven years after they had almost been relegated to the Conference. Fulham, Hartlepool United, Exeter City and Barnet were the teams relegated to Division Three.

Shrewsbury Town, Chester City and Crewe Alexandra claimed the three automatic promotion places in Division Three, while Martin O'Neill's Wycombe Wanderers won the play-offs in their first season of league football. Northampton Town finished bottom of the league, but were saved from demotion as Conference champions Kidderminster Harriers did not meet the league's stadium capacity requirements.

Final league tables and results 

The tables and results below are reproduced here in the exact form that they can be found at The Rec.Sport.Soccer Statistics Foundation website, with home and away statistics separated. Play-off results are from the same website.

First Division 
Following relegation from the Premier League at the end of the 1992-93 season, Crystal Palace earned an immediate return to the top flight by finishing champions of Division One with 90 points in their first season under manager Alan Smith. Their nearest rivals, Nottingham Forest, newly relegated and also with a new manager in Frank Clark, finished runners-up on 83 points.

After losing in the previous two playoff finals and on all of their six previous visits to Wembley, Leicester City finally won a Wembley final at the seventh attempt by beating local rivals Derby County in the Division One playoff final to end their seven-year absence from the top flight. Leicester's semi-final opponents Tranmere lost at this stage of the playoffs for a second successive season, also suffering defeat in the League Cup semi-finals. Third placed Millwall were defeated by Derby in the other semi-finals.

Four months after resigning as England manager, Graham Taylor succeeded long-serving Graham Turner as manager of a Wolves side who just fell short of the playoffs. Middlesbrough, another side who missed out on the playoffs, prepared for a promotion push in 1994-95 by appointing former Manchester United and England captain Bryan Robson as player-manager following the resignation of Lennie Lawrence at the end of the season.

At the other end of the table, Peterborough United's second season in Division One ended in relegation when they finished bottom of the table. Oxford United, who lost manager Brian Horton to Manchester City a few games into the season, were unable to avoid relegation under new manager Denis Smith, while the last relegation place went to Birmingham City, who were edged into the bottom three by local rivals West Bromwich Albion.

Play-offs

Results

Locations

Second Division 
In a tight promotion race contested between the sides who finished in Division Two's top four places, Reading won the title and clinched promotion in their third season under the management of Mark McGhee, with veteran striker Jimmy Quinn being the highest scorer in all four divisions with 35 goals. Port Vale, the previous season's losing semi finalists, went up as runners-up - their third promotion under the management of long-serving John Rudge. Plymouth Argyle and Stockport County missed out on automatic promotion and had to contest the playoffs with York City and Burnley. The semi-final between Burnley and Plymouth Argyle saw the Turf Moor side emerge as victors, while York City squandered their chances of a second successive promotion (and second-tier football for the first time since the mid 1970s) by losing to Stockport County in the other semi-final. Burnley won the Wembley final 2-1, ending their 11-year spell in the lower two divisions of the league and consigning Stockport to a fourth Wembley defeat in three seasons.

At the other end of the table, Barnet's first season in the third tier ended in relegation with a bottom place finish. Hartlepool United went down after three seasons. Exeter City had lost manager Alan Ball to Southampton halfway through the season and appointed Terry Cooper, manager of their 1990 promotion winning side, as Ball's successor, but were unable to avoid relegation. The final relegation place went to Fulham, who dropped into the fourth tier for the first time in their history. Blackpool, another fallen giant, managed to avoid relegation but survival was not enough for chairman Owen Oyston, who dismissed manager Billy Ayre after four seasons in charge and replaced him with Sam Allardyce.

Play-offs

Results

Locations

Third Division 
Shrewsbury Town's two-year spell back in the league's bottom tier ended in Division Three title glory and promotion under new manager Fred Davies, while Chester City earned an instant return to Division Two as runners-up of Division Three, only their second promotion in more than 60 years as a Football League side. The final automatic promotion place went to Crewe Alexandra, who had been beaten in the playoffs during the previous two seasons following their relegation in 1991. The final promotion place went to playoff winners Wycombe Wanderers, who triumphed 4-2 over Preston North End in the Wembley final at the end of their first season as a Football League side. Torquay United and Carlisle United were the losing semi-finalists in the playoffs, reflecting major progress as the two sides had battled against relegation to the Conference one season earlier.

There was no relegation from the Football League this season - for the first time since automatic relegation and promotion between the league's basement division and the Football Conference was introduced in 1987. This was due to stadium requirements introduced by the Football League for potential Conference champions, emerging from the stadium crisis and ensuing financial problems which had helped bring about the collapse of Maidstone United just three years after gaining league status by this route. Kidderminster Harriers, the Conference champions, did not meet the league requirements and were denied a place in Division Three for the 1994-95 season, which saved the league's bottom placed club Northampton Town from being relegated into non-league football.

Play-offs

Results

Locations

See also
1993–94 in English football

References

 
English Football League seasons
2